Christmas Lights is a 2004 British Christmas television special broadcast by ITV starring Robson Green and Mark Benton and written by Jeff Pope and Bob Mills. Although originally produced as a one-off 90 minute special, it spawned two spin-off series – Northern Lights and City Lights and a second, 2 hour, Christmas special – Clash of the Santas, which aired on ITV, on Sunday 21 December 2008.

The programme was watched by 10.5 million viewers.

Comedy drama about what can happen when families forget what the festive season is really about. Competitive brothers-in-law Colin and Howard live next door to each other on a suburban street, so when Colin puts Christmas lights outside his house, Howard responds with a bigger and brighter set, unleashing a war of twinkling light-bulbs and neon displays which threatens to ruin both families. With Robson Green, Mark Benton, Nicola Stephenson, Maxine Peake, Keith Clifford.

Cast
Robson Green as Colin Armstrong
Mark Benton as Howard Scott (Howie)
Nicola Stephenson as Jackie Armstrong
Maxine Peake as Pauline Scott

External links

Christmas Lights at The Robson Green Web Site
Review of Clash of the Santas, Leicester Mercury

Christmas television specials
ITV television dramas
Television series by ITV Studios
British television films
2004 television films
2004 films
English-language television shows